Plicatin B is a hydroxycinnamic acid found in Psoralea plicata.

References

Hydroxycinnamic acid esters
Vinylogous carboxylic acids